James Spaulding Plays the Legacy of Duke Ellington is an album by saxophonist James Spaulding featuring compositions by Duke Ellington which was recorded in 1976 and released on the Danish Storyville label.

Reception

The AllMusic review by Scott Yanow stated "Despite being a top altoist and flutist since at least the mid-'60s, when he played with Freddie Hubbard's band, James Spaulding did not get his recording debut as a leader until this 1976 LP. Spaulding, on various flutes, piccolo, soprano and alto, performs eight songs associated with Duke Ellington ... The most unusual aspect of this set is that Avery Brooks (who has a deep baritone that Ellington might have liked) sings four of the eight songs. A sincere tribute".

Track listing
All compositions by Duke Ellington except where noted
 "Take the "A" Train" (Duke Ellington, Billy Strayhorn) – 4:34
 "In a Sentimental Mood" – 5:56
 "Come Sunday" – 5:31
 "Caravan" (Ellington, Juan Tizol) – 5:30
 "I Love You Madly" – 2:13
 "Lucky So and So" (Ellington, Mack David) – 4:36
 "Sophisticated Lady" – 6:22
 "It Don't Mean a Thing (If It Ain't Got That Swing)" – 7:03

Personnel
James Spaulding – alto saxophone, flute, piccolo, soprano saxophone, bass flute
Cedar Walton – piano 
Steve Nelson – vibraphone
Sam Jones – bass 
Billy Higgins – drums
Mtume – percussion
Avery Brooks – vocals (tracks 3, 4, 5 & 7)

References

Storyville Records albums
James Spaulding albums
1977 albums
Duke Ellington tribute albums